Maxwell Communication Corporation plc was a leading British media business. It was listed on the London Stock Exchange and was a constituent of the FTSE 100 Index. It collapsed in 1991 following the death of its titular owner.

History
The company was established in 1964 when Hazell Sun merged with Purnell & Sons to form the British Printing Corporation. In 1967, the British Printing Corporation merged its magazines into Haymarket Group. During the 1970s the British Printing Corporation was involved in many disputes with trade unions. In 1978 such a dispute led to The Times and Sunday Times not being published for ten months.

In July 1981, Robert Maxwell launched a dawn raid on the company, acquiring a stake of 29%; the following year he secured full control of it. He changed the name of the company to British Printing & Communications Corporation in March 1982 and to Maxwell Communication Corporation in October 1987.

The company acquired Macmillan Publishers, a large US publisher, in 1988. It went on to buy Science Research Associates and the Official Airline Guide later that year. SRA was sold to a joint venture of Maxwell's Macmillan and McGraw Hill the next year.

The company went into administration in 1991 following the death of Robert Maxwell. Its properties were sold to various media companies. McGraw Hill acquired that part of Macmillan/McGraw Hill it did not already own outright. OAG was acquired by Reed Elsevier, while Macmillan was folded into Simon & Schuster.

In 1999, British courts determined that Coopers & Lybrand made gross errors during their audits of the Maxwell group of companies and fined Coopers & Lybrand a record £3.3 million.

References

Publishing companies established in 1964
Mass media companies disestablished in 1991
Companies formerly listed on the London Stock Exchange
Defunct companies based in London
Defunct mass media companies of the United Kingdom
Companies that have entered administration in the United Kingdom
British companies established in 1964
1991 disestablishments in England
British companies disestablished in 1991
Robert Maxwell